Glow Gardens (known as Lumaze in the United States) is an annual indoor Christmas light show that has been taking place in several North American cities since 2017. The festival is organized by CEO Lawrence Jansen in 2017 with the intention of using empty greenhouse spaces during the winter. The first festival took place during the holiday season in the Greater Vancouver city of Langley and its initial success allowed the organizers to expand to four cities in 2018. The next year the event once again broadened its geographical range by establishing itself in ten cities, becoming one of the major Christmas festivals in Canada.

In 2019, Glow once again experienced an expansion as it reached US cities Pittsburgh and Seattle under the name of Lumaze instead of Glow. With the passing of the years, the Glow/Lumaze Christmas festivals brand has only augmented in the number of cities and amount of visitors, becoming one of the main holiday attractions in North America. After the Covid-19 pandemic the event had to morph into a drive-through experience in some cities, nevertheless maintaining most of its main attractions. Glow/Lumaze is currently one of the biggest and most popular light shows in the world, with millions of visitors per year and more a million lights per location.

Locations
Each year every location opens around late November and closes in early January, except for 2018, whence an autumn version of the festival called Harvest Glow also took place in the chosen cities.

2017
Langley, Canada

2018
Edmonton, Canada
Langley, Canada
Barrie, Canada

2019
Abbotsford, Canada
Edmonton, Canada
Halifax, Canada
Ottawa, Canada
Toronto, Canada
Saskatoon, Canada
Vancouver, Canada
Odense, Denmark
Pittsburgh, United States
Seattle, United States

2020
Langley, Canada
Niagara Falls, Canada
Salt Lake City, United States

2021
Edmonton, Canada
Halifax, Canada
Langley, Canada
Saskatoon, Canada
Cincinnati, United States

2022
Edmonton, Canada
Halifax, Canada
Langley, Canada
Saskatoon, Canada
Toronto, Canada
Calgary, Canada
Hartford, USA

Themes and features
Glow and Lumaze display all kinds of fairytale and Christmas lights for the amusement of children and family units, the events also allocate different food and souvenir vendors throughout the parks. For the latest editions and given the coronavirus sanitary crisis, the festival has adopted a drive-through approach in some cities in which the visitors can experience all the light arrangements from the comfort of their vehicles.

The themes for the Glow/Lumaze festivals can vary depending on the city but they mainly constitute narratives surrounding traditional Christmas characters such as Santa Claus. For the most part, princesses and fairies are also included to highlight magical topics appealing to children. Some light arrangements are designed to resemble historical buildings as well such as the Taj Mahal, the Arc de Triomph, or ancient pyramids.

Glow and Lumaze are photo-op friendly events that promote Instagram challenges and contests amongst the visitors. These activities regularly follow the main themes for each year which were the cases in 2020 for "A Fairytale Christmas" in the US and "The Warmth of the Season" in Canada.

References

2017 establishments in British Columbia
Christmas in Canada
Christmas in the United States
Annual events in Canada
Annual events in the United States